Sri Lanka national football team fixtures and results in 1950–1979 are as follows:

1952

1953

1954

1955

1963

1964

1965

1968

1971

1972

1979

References 

1950s
1950s in Ceylon
1960s in Ceylon
1970s in Sri Lankan sport